Timothy Raines Jr. (born August 31, 1979) is an American former professional baseball outfielder. He is the son of Major League Baseball (MLB) Hall of Famer Tim Raines. Like his father, Raines is a switch-hitter and throws right-handed.

In a three-season career, Raines is a .213 hitter with seven RBI and no home runs in 75 games.

On October 4, 2001, Raines Jr. played center field and his father, Tim Raines Sr., played left field, in an Orioles' 5-4 loss to the Boston Red Sox. They became the second major league father-son duo to play in the same game, matching the feat turned by Ken Griffey Sr. and Ken Griffey Jr. (with the Seattle Mariners, on August 31).

Raines signed with the Chicago White Sox on March 7, 2009, to a minor league contract. He then signed with the Kansas City Royals on May 29, 2009, to a minor league contract.

In 2011, Raines played for the Newark Bears of the Can-Am League, who were managed by his father.

In 2017, the Orioles named Raines the hitting coach for the Short-Season A affiliate Aberdeen IronBirds.

See also
 List of second-generation Major League Baseball players

References

External links

Tim Raines Jr. at Pura Pelota (Venezuelan Professional Baseball League)

1979 births
Living people
African-American baseball players
American expatriate baseball players in Canada
Baltimore Orioles players
Baseball players from Memphis, Tennessee
Bowie Baysox players
Corpus Christi Hooks players
Delmarva Shorebirds players
Frederick Keys players
Gulf Coast Orioles players
Harrisburg Senators players
Major League Baseball center fielders
Navegantes del Magallanes players
American expatriate baseball players in Venezuela
New Orleans Zephyrs players
Newark Bears players
Omaha Royals players
Ottawa Lynx players
Rochester Red Wings players
Round Rock Express players
Seminole High School (Seminole County, Florida) alumni
Somerset Patriots players
Tiburones de La Guaira players
Tigres de Aragua players
Tucson Sidewinders players
Venados de Mazatlán players
American expatriate baseball players in Mexico
21st-century African-American sportspeople
20th-century African-American sportspeople